Nihilichnus is an ichnogenus of trace fossil. It was first described from bite traces in 2006. The ichnogenus contains two ichnospecies, Nihilichnus nihilicus and Nihilichnus mortalis. The ichnogenera Brutalichnus and Machichnus were described in the same paper.

References

See also
 Ichnology

Trace fossils